The Day Hell Broke Loose at Sicard Hollow is a digital EP by Maylene and the Sons of Disaster, being released on Ferret Records. It has three songs, two of which were later featured on their second album, II. Another is a song that did not make the cut for the first album.

Track listing

Personnel
 Dallas Taylor – lead vocals
 Scott Collum – lead guitar
 Josh Williams – rhythm guitar
 Roman Haviland – bass, rhythm guitar
 Lee Turner – drums

References

2007 EPs
Maylene and the Sons of Disaster albums